Jedediah Smith Redwoods State Park is a state park of California, United States, preserving old-growth redwoods along the Smith River. The park is named after explorer Jedediah Smith, and is one of four parks cooperatively managed as Redwood National and State Parks. The  park was established in 1929 and designated part of the California Coast Ranges International Biosphere Reserve in 1983.

History

The park was named after explorer Jedediah Smith, who was the first American to travel, by land, from the Mississippi River to California in 1826, passing through the area of the future park.

Ecology

The Smith River, which flows through the park, is home to rainbow trout and salmon, black bears, black-tailed deer, squirrels, chipmunks, raccoons and other mammals.

The Smith River is the last major undammed river in California.

Recreation
Mill Creek flows through the park and merges with the Smith River near the campground. In the warm season, a seasonal bridge is placed across Mill Creek for easier access to Mill Creek Trail and one end of Hiouchi Trail.

See also
List of California state parks

References

External links 
Official Jedediah Smith Redwoods State Park website
Redwood National and State Parks
North Coast Redwood Interpretive Association
Official Visitor Website for Del Norte County

Redwood National and State Parks
Parks in Del Norte County, California
State parks of California
Coast redwood groves
Old-growth forests
Protected areas established in 1939
1939 establishments in California